The 1996–97 Club Necaxa season was the 9th season since the team's revival after being replaced by Atlético Español in 1971. Necaxa competed in Primera División and Copa México, reaching the final in the Invierno 1996 tournament.

Coaching staff

Players

Squad information

Players and squad numbers last updated on 1 February 2019.Note: Flags indicate national team as has been defined under FIFA eligibility rules. Players may hold more than one non-FIFA nationality.

Competitions

Overview

Torneo Invierno

League table

Results summary

Torneo Verano

League table

Results summary

Statistics

Own goals

References

Club Necaxa seasons
1996–97 Mexican Primera División season
1996–97 in Mexican football